Ishq Ki Dastaan - Naagmani is an Indian Hindi supernatural drama and fantasy Indian television series produced by Story Square Productions which was premiered on 13 June 2022 on Dangal TV. The series stars Aleya Ghosh, Aditya Redij, Pavitra Punia and Karam Rajpal.

Series overview

Plot 
Naagmani embodies an immortal love story of two supernatural beings who fall prey to the greed of a witch. It captures a tale of love between the shape-shifting Naag - Naagin and the never-ending greed of the evil witch seeking immortality by acquiring the life-giving jewel possessed by the Naagin. Under the shadow of a witch, will a wishful/shape-shifting serpent be able to write their great love story.

Cast

Main 
 Aleya Ghosh as Paro/Rupa: Shankar's wife(Season 1) (Female shape-shifting serpent Icchadhari Naagin); Dev's Wife (season 2)
 Pavitra Punia as Mohini: The Witch (Chudail), Dhurjan's second wife
Karam Rajpal as Dev;Rupa's Husband(season 2);Devika's Son

Recurring 
 Aditya Redij as Shankar Rana: Paro's husband (Naag), Dhurjan's son, Babbyl's Brother (2022 - 2023)
 Shubhalaxmi Das as Nanda, pappy's mother (2022 - 2023)
 Neha Yadav as Rambha, Manmohan's wife, Mohini's sister-in-law (2022 - 2023)
 Garima Verma as Jyothi, Shankar's friend(2022 - 2023)
 Mehul Kajaria(2022 - 2023)
 Aditya Shukla as Manmohan, Rambha's husband, Mohini's younger brother(2022 - 2023)
 Shashank Sharma as Pappy Singh: Nanda's son,babbly's husband (2022 - 2023)
 Nandini Maurya as babli, Durjan's Daughter, Shankar's sister; Puppy's wife (2022 - 2023)
 Imran Khan as Mr. Durjan Rana, Shankar's and Babli's father(2022 - 2023)
 Syed Ashraf Karim as Girdhari Kaka(2022 - 2023)
 Paramveer Singh as Govind ( Child incarnation of Bhagwan Shri Krishna )(2022)
Riddhi Sharma as Bulbul;Paro's daughter
Dhananjay Pandey as Bhola(2023)
Swati Pansare as Devika, Dev's Mother
Anshul Bammi as Raman
Ahmad Harhash as Rohan Mishra
Bobby Khanna
Dev Rathor 
Pallavi Rao
Jiten Trehan - Head of the Family

Cameo Appearances
Vaibhavi Hankare as Mishri from Sindoor Ki Keemat (2022)

Soundtrack 
The show's romantic track "Janam Pe Janam" received positive response, and also reached over one million views on YouTube.

References

External links 
 
 Ishq Ki Dastaan - Naagmani on Dangal Play

Indian television soap operas
2022 Indian television series debuts
Indian drama television series
Hindi-language television shows
Dangal TV original programming